Saint Alexander of Bergamo (died c. 303) is the patron saint of Bergamo, as well as Capriate San Gervasio and Cervignano d'Adda. Alexander may have been a Roman soldier or resident of Bergamo who was tortured and killed for not renouncing his Christian faith. Details of his life are uncertain, but subsequent Christian stories consider him a centurion of the Theban Legion commanded by Saint Maurice.

Legend
Before the commencement of the Diocletianic Persecution in 303, both Galerius and Maximian in the West inaugurated, on their own responsibility, a crusade against Christianity and sought particularly to remove all Christians from the armies. St. Alexander was one of the victims of this persecution. He is reputed to have been a survivor of the decimation (the killing of every tenth man) ordered against the Theban Legion. He escaped to Milan.

At Milan, he was recognized and imprisoned, and it was demanded that he renounce his Christian faith. However, he was visited in jail by Saint Fidelis and Bishop Saint Maternus. With the help of Fidelis, Alexander managed to escape. Alexander fled to Como but was captured again.

Brought back to Milan, he was once more condemned to death by decapitation. However, the executioner's arms went stiff during the execution. He was imprisoned again, but Alexander once again managed to escape and ended up in Bergamo after passing through Fara Gera d'Adda and Capriate San Gervasio. At Bergamo, he was the guest of the lord Crotacius, who bid him to hide from his persecutors. However, Alexander decided to become a preacher instead and converted many natives of Bergamo, including Firmus and Rusticus, who were later martyred. Alexander was once again captured and was finally decapitated on August 26, 303, on the spot now occupied by the church of San Alessandro in Colonna.

Veneration

Bergamo Cathedral is dedicated to him and dates from the 4th century. He is one of the saints in the dedication of the church in Rome for natives of Bergamo.

Notes

External links
 Sant' Alessandro di Bergamo
Saints.SQPN: Alexander of Bergamo

Year of birth unknown
303 deaths
Saints from Roman Italy
Ancient Roman soldiers
Religious leaders from Bergamo
4th-century Romans
4th-century Christian martyrs
Military saints